The Rennell Island monitor (Varanus juxtindicus) is a species of monitor lizards found in the Solomon Islands archipelago. It is also known as the Hakoi Monitor. It belongs to the subgenus Euprepiosaurus along with the canopy goanna, the peach-throated monitor, Kalabeck's monitor, and others.

Distribution
This species is endemic to Rennell Island, one of the smaller of the Solomon Islands. It is especially found near Niupani.

Description
The Rennell Island monitor can reach a length of up to 150  cm from snout to tail.  The pattern and coloration on its back are very similar to V. indicus, but this species is distinguished from the other members of the subgenus Euprepiosaurus by the lack of blue coloration (see Varanus yuwonoi and Varanus doreanus). Its tail shows no bands, nor is there a visible band on the side of the head.  The throat of V. juxtindicus lacks a noticeable pattern. Its tongue only has pigment at the tip. The first third of its tail is round in diameter, without any keel. "

References

Further reading
 Böhme W.; Philipp, K. & Ziegler T. (2002). Another new member of the Varanus (Euprepiosaurus) indicus group (Sauria: Varanidae): an undescribed species from Rennell Island, Solomon Islands. Salamandra 38 (1): 15-26.
 Böhme,W. 2003. Checklist of the living monitor lizards of the world (family Varanidae). Zool. Verhand., Leiden 341: 6-43.
 Koch A, Arida E, Schmitz A, Böhme W, Ziegler T. (2009). Refining the polytypic species concept of mangrove monitors (Squamata: Varanus indicus group): a new cryptic species from the Talaud Islands, Indonesia, reveals the underestimated diversity of Indo-Australian monitor lizards. Australian Journal of Zoology 57(1): 29-40
 McCoy, M. (1980). Reptiles of the Solomon Islands. Wau Ecology Institute Handbook 7. Wau Ecology Institute, Wau, Papua New Guinea.
 Ziegler, T., Schmitz, A., Koch, A. & W. Böhme (2007). A review of the subgenus Euprepiosaurus of Varanus (Squamata: Varanidae): morphological and molecular phylogeny, distribution and zoogeography, with an identification key for the members of the V. indicus and the V. prasinus species groups. Zootaxa 1472: 1-28
 Ziegler, Thomas; Wolfgang Böhme, Andreas Schmitz 2007. A new species of the Varanus indicus group (Squamata, Varanidae) from Halmahera Island, Moluccas: morphological and molecular evidence. Mitteilungen aus dem Museum für Naturkunde in Berlin 83 (S1): 109-119

Varanus
Reptiles described in 2002
Reptiles of the Solomon Islands
Rennell and Bellona Islands